Nazareth College ("Naz") is a private college in Pittsford, New York. It offers over 60 undergraduate majors and more than two dozen graduate programs. The college was previously the Nazareth College of Rochester.

History

Founding
At the request of Thomas Francis Hickey, Bishop of Rochester, five Sisters of St. Joseph founded Nazareth College of Rochester in 1924. The first class was composed of 25 young women who began their studies in a large mansion on Lake Avenue in Rochester, New York. The original mansion that housed the college was known as "the Glass House." At that time, the college offered Bachelor of Arts and Bachelor of Science degrees, each with a liberal arts core. In response to increasing enrollment, the college moved to a larger facility in 1928 at 402 Augustine Street.

Move to East Avenue
In January 1942, the college moved to its present campus on East Avenue in Pittsford. In the 1950s, the college responded to the need for graduate study by adding majors and by the 1970s offered programs in teacher education and social work.  Study abroad programs and intercollegiate sports were also added in the 1970s. During this time, the college became co-educational and independent of the Roman Catholic Church.

Nazareth competed in men's intercollegiate athletics for the first time in 1977. The official nickname of the sports teams became the Golden Flyers — golden for the Nazareth color, and flyers for the bird-like symbol that is part of the old Nazareth logo. Today, Nazareth supports 25 varsity teams. The most recently introduced sport, which began competition in 2019, is men's rugby.

Expansion
In the early 2000s, the college purchased adjacent land from the Sisters of St. Joseph, including the former Motherhouse and Infirmary. This acquisition doubled the campus size to its current 150 acres.  As a result of support from college benefactors (including Tom Golisano, the founder of Paychex), the Motherhouse became the Golisano Academic Center. The Infirmary became George Hall, a residence hall that also houses a coffeehouse and late night study area. The decade of the 2000s also saw the construction of additional student housing, including Portka Hall, Clock Tower Commons, and the Lyons and Breen apartment buildings.

In 2003, 30 years after becoming religiously independent, Nazareth College was removed from The Official Catholic Directory, having been declared no longer a Catholic institution by Rochester Bishop Matthew H. Clark. It was the second time since Pope John Paul II issued Ex Corde Ecclesiae, the apostolic constitution on Catholic universities in 1990, that a bishop declared a formerly Catholic college or university to be not Catholic.

In 2012, Nazareth added Peckham Hall, the Integrated Center for Math and Science, to its campus. Named after lead donors Nancy and Larry Peckham, the $30 million facility supports majors in math and science fields, as well as education programs. It also provides important learning facilities for students in health and human services programs.

In 2015, the York Wellness and Rehabilitation Institute opened after an extensive renovation/expansion of Carroll Hall. The institute consolidated and doubled the size of the clinics associated with the college's School of Health and Human Services and added collaboration space.

Campus

The Golisano Academic Center was built in 1927. It is the oldest and largest building on campus, once serving as the "motherhouse" for the Sisters of St. Joseph. It was purchased from the Sisters of St. Joseph in 2003 and is now used for academic and administrative purposes. Features of the Center include the Linehan Chapel and Cafe Sorelle. 
The Nazareth College Arts Center, which houses the departments of Theatre Arts, Music, and Art, opened in 1967. The Arts Center was renovated in September 2009 to become a dance and performance venue.
The Golisano Training Center (opened in fall 2019), is a multi-use facility supporting varsity athletics, Special Olympics events, fitness, and a wide range of campus activities.
The Jane and Laurence Glazer Music Performance Center, providing state-of-the-art acoustics, opened in fall 2018.
Nazareth's Integrated Center for Math and Science, Peckham Hall, opened in fall 2012. The center features multi-purpose research spaces (including state-of-the-art labs and classrooms), a range of support services, and a variety of student centers. It is also the first project on campus to achieve a Leadership in Energy & Environmental Design (LEED)-certified green building rating.

On-campus clinics for speech and hearing, reading and physical therapy allow students to gain practical experience and are also open to the Rochester community.
Although Nazareth College has been independent since the 1970s, the legacy of the Sisters of St. Joseph is honored by the Meditation Garden located next to Golisano Academic Center that includes a labyrinth, benches, and a statue of Mary that once stood on the grounds of Smyth Hall.
A network of tunnels connects many buildings on campus, allowing students and employees to avoid the cold and snow of upstate New York winters.

It was listed as a census-designated place in 2020.

Academics
Nazareth College is organized into four core schools:
The College of Arts and Sciences
The School of Education
The School of Health and Human Services
The School of Business and Leadership

Nazareth offers more than 60 four-year undergraduate programs, more than 20 master's degree programs, a Doctorate of Physical Therapy, and three post-baccalaureate certificate programs.

Fulbright program
From 2009 to 2018, 30 Nazareth students were accepted to the Fulbright Program. The Chronicle of Higher Education placed Nazareth in the #1 spot (in the Master's Institutions category) of the Chronicle of Higher Education’s Top Producers of U.S. Fulbright Students, 2012–13 list. Since 1990, Nazareth graduates have been granted Fulbright awards for study in Andorra, Argentina, Australia, Belgium, Colombia, Egypt, France, Finland, Germany, Honduras, Hungary, India, Israel, Malaysia, Nepal, New Zealand, Poland, Slovak Republic, Slovenia, South Korea, Spain, Sri Lanka, Sweden, Venezuela, and Yemen.

Honors Program
Nazareth College offers a unique interdisciplinary honors minor to provide its academically-strongest and most intellectually-curious students with opportunities and challenges appropriate to their abilities and motivation. The goal of the program is to encourage academic excellence, intellectual curiosity, independent scholarship, and community connection. Honors scholars complete the honors foundation courses and then select one of three tracks to pursue: research, engagement, or global. Scholars complete a capstone project which they defend at Nazareth's Creative Activity and Research Showcase (CARS) Symposium.

Clinton Global Initiative University
In fall 2013, Nazareth College joined the Clinton Global Initiative University Network (CGI U), a consortium of colleges and universities that support, mentor, and provide seed funding to student leaders who are developing solutions to the world's most pressing challenges. From 2014 to 2018, CGI U selected a total of 31 students from Nazareth College to attend its three-day international conference, based on the strength of the projects they proposed in health, education, youth empowerment, and the environment.

Nazareth College Arts Center

Renovated in 2009, the Nazareth College Arts Center is a campus venue with spaces including:
Sands Family Pavilion, featuring a grand staircase leading to Callahan Theater;
Jayne Summers Hall, a space for gathering before performances and during intermission;
Fine Arts Gallery, a large space for Nazareth College, greater Rochester, and national exhibitions;
Lipson Patrons Lounge
Wegman Family Sculpture Garden, a four-season garden featuring three-dimensional artwork by Nazareth College faculty;
Master's Family Community Theater, a smaller space for community performances and events;
Callahan Theater, a theater that seats approximately 800;
Performance Studio, a space for dance and theater rehearsals, instruction, and creation;
Margaret Colacino Gallery, a space for student and faculty art shows, as well as national art exhibitions.

The Nazareth College Arts Center is the home of Bach Children's Chorus as well as the performance home of Rochester City Ballet and Garth Fagan Dance. The Arts Center houses the Nazareth College departments of Art, Music, and Theatre & Dance.

Hickey Center for Interfaith Studies and Dialogue
The Center for Interfaith Studies and Dialogue (CISD) at Nazareth College was founded in 2005. In 2011, International Institute of Islamic Thought (IIIT) of Herndon, Virginia offered Nazareth a major gift, provided it was matched by local donors. Brian and Jean Hickey matched this gift, resulting in renaming the center of the Hickey Center for Interfaith Studies and Dialogue at Nazareth College. The endowed chair of the center was left to the IIIT, and they selected Dr. Muhammad Shafiq, who was the imam of the Islamic Center of Rochester, the Rochester metropolitan area's largest mosque. The center is part of Nazareth's College of Arts and Sciences and located in the Golisano Academic Center. Dr. Muhammad Shafiq is the executive director of the Hickey Center for Interfaith Studies and Dialogue and a professor of Islamic and religious studies at the college.

Casa Italiana
The Casa Italiana (Italian House) is a center of Italian language, literature, and culture. It serves as a cultural center for the college and the Rochester metropolitan area. Built with the help of the Italian-American community of greater Rochester in 1978, the Casa promotes traditional and contemporary Italian culture, explores the Italian-American experience, and seeks to enhance exchanges between the United States and Italy.  The reading room at the Casa provides the college and the community with language and culture resources, and the classroom provides an environment in which students and community members can study the Italian language. Cultural events organized by the Casa include lectures, cooking and language classes, film nights, conferences, concerts, seminars, symposia, bocce tournaments, art shows, and trips to Italy.

Maison Française
La Maison Française (French House) is a home converted into a cultural center and residence hall for 13 selected foreign language majors. The French House offers a living environment and resource center for students who wish to immerse themselves in French culture and practice speaking French.  La Maison Française also offers a line-up of cultural events throughout the year.  Such gatherings, which include French film nights, cultural and historical lectures, reader's theater showcases, Francophone regional dinners, and campus diversity dinners, occur on Thursday evenings and are prepared by the French department and the house residents.

Casa Hispana
At the heart of the Spanish program is the Casa Hispana, a place where students and community members enjoy films, conversation, art exhibitions, and a variety of events relating to the culture of Spain and the Latin American countries. The Casa also houses the offices of the Spanish program faculty, a library, and classrooms.

Rankings 

Nazareth was among The Princeton Review's "The Best 382 Colleges" for 2018.

Athletics

Nazareth's men's and women's athletic teams are members of the National Collegiate Athletic Association's (NCAA) Division III. The Golden Flyers are a member of the Empire 8 Athletic Conference (Empire 8). For men's volleyball, Nazareth is a member of the single-sport United Volleyball Conference and for men's ice hockey, a member of the United Collegiate Hockey Conference. Athletic facilities at Nazareth include the Robert A. Kidera Gymnasium (1,200) and Golden Flyer Stadium (2,200).

Men's sports include basketball, cross country, equestrian, golf, ice hockey, lacrosse, soccer, swimming & diving, tennis, track & field, and volleyball; while women's sports include basketball, cross country, equestrian, field hockey, golf, lacrosse, soccer, softball, swimming & diving, tennis, track & field, volleyball, and dance. The college added women's hockey in 2018.

The Nazareth men's lacrosse team is a three-time NCAA Division III National Champion (1992, 1996, and 1997). The team has also appeared in the NCAA postseason tournament nineteen times. In 2011, the Nazareth men's indoor volleyball team achieved a #1 national ranking and won the Molten Division III National Championship, while in 2013 they finished runner-up in the NCAA Division III championship to Springfield.

Nazareth College's traditional rival is St. John Fisher University, just a mile north. The annual men's basketball game between the schools is known as "The Battle of the Beaks."

Community service
More than 95% of students are involved in community service through academic service-learning, student organizations, athletics, and residence life. Nazareth has an on-campus Center for Civic Engagement to serve as a resource for students, staff, and faculty who want to learn and serve in the context of the local, regional, national and global communities. The center is also a point of contact for community members seeking College involvement with local organizations, programs, and projects. The school also has a campus ministry program to connect students to various volunteer organizations. In addition, over 60% of alumni are known to participate regularly in community service. In 2007, the college was named to the President's Higher Education Community Service Honor Roll (with distinction). I n 2013, Nazareth was only one of five schools in the country named to the 2013 President's Higher Education Community Service Honor Roll, the highest honor a college or university can receive, at the federal level, for its commitment to volunteering, service-learning, and civic engagement.

Alumni
.Nazareth has more than 33,000 alumni living in all 50 states and 38 countries around the world.

Notable Nazareth alumni include:
Catherine "Cathie" Cool Rumsey, Democratic member of the Rhode Island Senate from January 2013 until January 2014
Gail Haines, a Republican member of the Michigan House of Representatives from January 2009 until January 2014
Jim Jabir, former head coach of the University of Dayton women's basketball team and leader in all-time wins
Michael Park, Emmy award-winning actor, known for As the World Turns, Stranger Things, and the Tony award-winning Broadway musical Dear Evan Hansen
Neal Powless, Iroquois lacrosse player from the Six Nations of the Grand River Indian reserve near Brantford, Ontario
Manuel Rivera-Ortiz, documentary photographer
Jeff Van Gundy, head coach in the National Basketball Association (NBA) from 1996 to 2007 before becoming an NBA analyst for ESPN

References

External links

 Official website
 Nazareth College Archives at New York Heritage Digital Collections

 
Educational institutions established in 1924
Italian-American culture in New York (state)
Educational buildings in Rochester, New York
Cultural education
Former Catholic universities and colleges in the United States
Universities and colleges in Monroe County, New York
1924 establishments in New York (state)
Private universities and colleges in New York (state)